Jordon Southorn (born May 15, 1990) is a Canadian professional ice hockey defenceman. He is currently playing for HC Košice of the Slovak Exraliga.

He was selected by the Buffalo Sabres in the fourth round (104th overall) of the 2008 NHL Entry Draft.

Playing career
Southorn played four seasons (2006–2010) of major junior hockey in the Quebec Major Junior Hockey League with the Prince Edward Island Rocket. Unsigned from the Sabres, on September 4, 2012, the Elmira Jackals of the ECHL signed Southorn for the 2012–13 season.

After a short stint in the Elite Ice Hockey League with the Dundee Stars, Southorn returned to the ECHL with the Fort Wayne Komets in the 2013–14 season.

Having played a single game on loan with the Pirates in the season prior, on July 31, 2014, Southorn signed a one-year AHL contract with the Portland Pirates. In the 2014–15 season, Southorn was limited by injury an appeared in 26 games with the Pirates for 9 points. He was loaned to ECHL affiliate, the Gwinnett Gladiators on two occasions, totalling 9 points in just 8 games.

On August 5, 2015, unable to secure an AHL contract, Southorn returned on a one-year deal for a second stint with the Fort Wayne Komets of the ECHL.

In the following off-season, Southorn left for abroad as a free agent, signing a one-year deal with Russian second division club, Torpedo Ust-Kamenogorsk of the VHL on August 12, 2016. He made his Kontinental Hockey League debut in the following 2017-18 season, with parent affiliate Barys Astana making 23 appearances for four assists.

On July 24, 2018, Southorn left Kazakhstan after two seasons and agreed to an initial try-out contract with German club, the Straubing Tigers of the Deutsche Eishockey Liga (DEL). Following his release from Straubing, Southorn opted to return to North America and the ECHL, securing a one-year contract with the Florida Everblades on September 28, 2018. In the 2018–19 season, Southorn collected 17 points in 21 games before leaving the club to accept a European contract with HC '05 Banská Bystrica of the Slovak Extraliga on December 10, 2018.

Career statistics

Awards and honors

References

External links

1990 births
Living people
Canadian ice hockey defencemen
Ice hockey people from Montreal
Canadian expatriate ice hockey players in Kazakhstan
Canadian expatriate ice hockey players in Scotland
Canadian expatriate ice hockey players in the United States
Buffalo Sabres draft picks
P.E.I. Rocket players
Trenton Devils players
Wheeling Nailers players
Providence Bruins players
Elmira Jackals (ECHL) players
Dundee Stars players
Fort Wayne Komets players
Portland Pirates players
Gwinnett Gladiators players
Manitoba Moose players
Florida Everblades players
Barys Nur-Sultan players
HC '05 Banská Bystrica players
HK Dukla Michalovce players
Orli Znojmo players
Dinamo Riga players
HC Košice players
Canadian expatriate ice hockey players in Latvia
Canadian expatriate ice hockey players in the Czech Republic
Canadian expatriate ice hockey players in Slovakia